HMS A12 was an  submarine built for the Royal Navy in the first decade of the 20th century. After surviving World War I, she was sold for scrap in 1920.

Design and description
A12 was a member of the first British class of submarines, although slightly larger, faster and more heavily armed than the lead ship, . They displaced  on the surface and  submerged. The A-class submarines had a crew of 2 officers and 9 ratings.

For surface running, the boats were powered by a single 16-cylinder  Wolseley petrol engine that drove one propeller shaft. When submerged the propeller was driven by a  electric motor. They could reach  on the surface and  underwater.

The boats were armed with two 18-inch (45 cm) torpedo tubes in the bow. They could carry a pair of reload torpedoes, but generally did not as they would have to remove an equal weight of fuel in compensation.

Construction and career
A12 was ordered as part of the 1903–04 Naval Programme from at Vickers. She was laid down at the shipyard in Barrow-in-Furness in 1903, launched on 3 March 1905 and completed on 23 September.

Notes

References

External links
MaritimeQuest HMS A-12 Pages

 

A-class submarines (1903)
World War I submarines of the United Kingdom
Ships built in Barrow-in-Furness
Royal Navy ship names
1905 ships